Campari is an Italian alcoholic liqueur, considered an apéritif (20.5%, 21%, 24%, 25%, or 28.5% ABV, depending on the country where it is sold), obtained from the infusion of herbs and fruit (including chinotto and cascarilla) in alcohol and water. It is a type of bitters, characterised by its dark red colour.

Use
Campari is often used in cocktails and is commonly served with soda water or citrus juice (most often pink grapefruit juice), often garnished with either blood orange or blood lime slice (mainly in Australia) or mixed with prosecco as a spritz. It is produced by the Davide Campari Group, a multinational company based in Italy.

Campari is an essential ingredient in the classic Negroni cocktail, the Garibaldi, the Americano (which was named at a time when few Americans were aware of Campari), and the spritz (an aperitif popular in northern Italy).

In the Italian market, Campari mixed with soda water is sold in individual bottles as Campari Soda (10% alcohol by volume). Campari Soda is packaged in a distinctive bottle that was designed by Fortunato Depero in 1932.

History
Campari was invented in 1860 by Gaspare Campari in Novara, Italy. It was originally coloured with carmine dye, derived from crushed cochineal insects, which gave the drink its distinctive red colour. Campari Group discontinued the use of carmine in 2006.

In 1904, Campari's first production plant was opened in Sesto San Giovanni, near Milan, Italy. Under the direction of Davide Campari, Gaspare's son, the company began to export the beverage, first to Nice in the heart of the French Riviera, then overseas. 

The Campari brand is now distributed in over 190 countries. Campari is a registered trademark of Davide Campari Milano S.P.A., which is part of Gruppo Campari (Campari Group).

Awards

Wine Enthusiast has reviewed Campari on a number of occasions, giving it a score of "85-89/100" in 2007.

See also

 Aperol
 Boulevardier
 Cinzano
 Cynar
 Fernet
 Negroni
 Select

References

External links

 
 "Campari: the Italian classic that still has style", The Daily Telegraph
 Chapter 9: "Campari: product diversification and international expansion", Corporate Strategy and Firm Growth: Creating Value for Shareholders, by Angelo Dringoli
 The Art of Campari

Campari Group
Bitters
Italian liqueurs
Products introduced in 1860
Italian brands